Senator Kershaw may refer to:

Joseph B. Kershaw (1822–1894), South Carolina State Senate
William J. Kershaw (died 1883), Wisconsin State Senate